Leslie Gabriel Valiant  (born 28 March 1949) is a British American computer scientist and computational theorist. He was born to a chemical engineer father and a translator mother. He is currently the T. Jefferson Coolidge Professor of Computer Science and Applied Mathematics at Harvard University. Valiant was awarded the Turing Award in 2010, having been described by the A.C.M. as a heroic figure in theoretical computer science and a role model for  his courage and creativity in addressing some of the deepest unsolved problems in science; in particular for his "striking combination of depth and breadth".

Education
Valiant was educated at King's College, Cambridge, Imperial College London, and the University of Warwick where he received a PhD in computer science in 1974.

Research and career
Valiant is world-renowned for his work in theoretical computer science.  Among his many contributions to complexity theory, he introduced the notion of #P-completeness ("sharp-P completeness") to explain why enumeration and reliability problems are intractable.  He also introduced the "probably approximately correct" (PAC) model of machine learning that has helped the field of computational learning theory grow, and the concept of holographic algorithms. In computer systems, he is most well-known for introducing the bulk synchronous parallel processing model. His earlier work in automata theory includes an algorithm for context-free parsing, which is (as of 2010) still the asymptotically fastest known. He also works in computational neuroscience focusing on understanding memory and learning.

Valiant's 2013 book is Probably Approximately Correct: Nature's Algorithms for Learning and Prospering in a Complex World. In it he argues, among other things, that evolutionary biology does not explain the rate at which evolution occurs, writing, for example, "The evidence for Darwin's general schema for evolution being essentially correct is convincing to the great majority of biologists. This author has been to enough natural history museums to be convinced himself. All this, however, does not mean the current theory of evolution is adequately explanatory. At present the theory of evolution can offer no account of the rate at which evolution progresses to develop complex mechanisms or to maintain them in changing environments."

Valiant started teaching at Harvard University in 1982 and is currently the T. Jefferson Coolidge Professor of Computer Science and Applied Mathematics in the Harvard School of Engineering and Applied Sciences.  Prior to 1982 he taught at Carnegie Mellon University, the University of Leeds, and the University of Edinburgh.

Awards and honors
Valiant received the Nevanlinna Prize in 1986, the Knuth Prize in 1997, the EATCS Award in 2008, and the Turing Award in 2010. He was elected a Fellow of the Royal Society (FRS) in 1991, a Fellow of the Association for the Advancement of Artificial Intelligence (AAAI) in 1992, and a member of the United States National Academy of Sciences in 2001. Valiant's nomination for the Royal Society reads:

The citation for his A.M. Turing Award reads:

Personal life
His two sons  Gregory Valiant and Paul Valiant are both also theoretical computer scientists.

References

External links 

1949 births
Living people
Members of the United States National Academy of Sciences
Turing Award laureates
Nevanlinna Prize laureates
Knuth Prize laureates
British computer scientists
Theoretical computer scientists
Alumni of the Department of Computing, Imperial College London
Alumni of the University of Warwick
Academics of the University of Edinburgh
John A. Paulson School of Engineering and Applied Sciences faculty
Fellows of the Royal Society
Fellows of the Association for the Advancement of Artificial Intelligence
Fellows of the American Association for the Advancement of Science
People from Belmont, Massachusetts
People from Budapest